Heřmanice or Hermanice may refer to:

 Hermanice, Ustroń, Silesian Voivodeship, Poland

Czech Republic
 Heřmanice (Havlíčkův Brod District), village in Havlíčkův Brod District
 Heřmanice (Liberec District), village in Liberec District
 Heřmanice (Náchod District), village in Náchod District
 Heřmanice u Oder, village in Nový Jičín District
 Dolní Heřmanice, village in Žďár nad Sázavou District
 České Heřmanice, village in Ústí nad Orlicí District
 Svobodné Heřmanice, village in Bruntál District
 Heřmanice (Ostrava), part of the city of Ostrava